Legends are Made, Not Born is a d20 Dungeon Crawl Classics adventure written for Dungeons & Dragons by Chris Doyle. It is the first DCC to feature 0-level characters (PCs with 1 level in an NPC class).

Plot
For the past few years, an ogre that lairs in a cave near the wilderness town of Dundraville has demanded tributes of ale and supplies. The villagers were happy to comply, lest the brute attack them or destroy their property. But recently, the ogre changed his demands. Now he wants gold, building supplies -- and captives! The villagers have no heroes to protect them -- so someone must rise to the challenge! Six determined townsfolk have decided to take justice into their own hands. Can these village commoners defeat the ogre in his own lair before their fellows are eaten?

D20 System adventures
Role-playing game supplements introduced in 2003